The Court of Appeals is an appellate collegiate court in the Philippines. The Court of Appeals consists of one presiding justice and sixty-eight associate justices. Pursuant to the Constitution, the Court of Appeals "reviews not only the decisions and orders of the Regional Trial Courts awards, judgments, final orders or resolutions of, or authorized by administrative agencies exercising quasi-judicial functions mentioned in Rule 43 of the 1997 Rules of Civil Procedure, plus the National Amnesty Commission (Pres. Proclamation No. 347 of 1994) and the Office of the Ombudsman". Under Republic Act No. 9282, which elevated the Court of Tax Appeals to the same level of the Court of Appeals, en banc decisions of the Court of Tax Appeals are subject to review by the Supreme Court instead of the Court of Appeals (as opposed to what is currently provided in Section 1, Rule 43 of the Rules of Court). Added to the formidable list are the decisions and resolutions of the National Labor Relations Commission which are now initially reviewable by the Court of Appeals, instead of a direct recourse to the Supreme Court, via petition for certiorari under Rule 65.

The Court of Appeals buildings is at Maria Orosa Street, Ermita in Manila, on the grounds of what used to be part of the University of the Philippines Manila campus.

History 

Organized on February 1, 1936, the Court of Appeals was initially composed of Justice Pedro Concepcion, as the first presiding judge, and ten appellate judges appointed by the president of the Philippines with the consent of the Commission on Appointments of the National Assembly. It had exclusive appellate jurisdiction of all cases not falling under the original and exclusive appellate jurisdiction of the seven-man Supreme Court. Its decisions in those cases were final, except when the Supreme Court upon petition for certiorari on questions of law required that the case be certified to it for review. It had also original jurisdiction to issue writs of mandamus, prohibition, injunction, certiorari, habeas corpus and all other auxiliary writs in aid of its appellate jurisdiction. The court then sat either en banc or in two divisions, one of six and another of five judges. The appellate judges had the same qualifications as those provided by the Constitution for Supreme Court justices.

In March 1938, the appellate judges were named justices and their number increased from eleven to fifteen, with three divisions of five under Commonwealth Act No. 259. On December 24, 1941, the membership of the court was further increased to nineteen justices under Executive Order No. 395.

The court functioned during the Japanese occupation from 1941 to 1944. However, in March 1945, due to abnormal conditions at the time, the court was abolished by President Sergio Osmeña through Executive Order No. 37. The end of World War II restored the democratic processes in the country. On October 4, 1946, Republic Act No. 52 was passed, recreating the Court of Appeals, with a presiding justice and fourteen associate justices. The court was composed of five divisions of three justices each.

On August 23, 1956, the membership of the court was expanded to eighteen justices per Republic Act No. 1605. The number was hiked to twenty-four justices as decreed by Republic Act No. 5204 approved on June 15, 1968. Ten years later, the unabated swelling of the court's dockets called for a much bigger court of forty-five justices under Presidential Decree No. 1482 of June 10, 1978.  Then came the judiciary reorganization on January 17, 1983, through Executive Order No. 864 of President Ferdinand Marcos. The court was renamed the Intermediate Appellate Court, and its membership was enlarged to fifty-one justices. However, only thirty-seven justices were appointed to this court.

On July 28, 1986, President Corazon Aquino issued Executive Order No. 33, which restored the original name of the appellate court to the Court of Appeals and its presiding justice and fifty associate justices.

On February 23, 1995, Republic Act No. 7902 was passed, which expanded the jurisdiction of the court effective March 18, 1995. On December 30, 1996, Republic Act No. 8246 created six more divisions in the court, thereby increasing its membership from fifty-one to sixty-nine justices.  These additional divisions—three for the Visayas and three for Mindanao—paved the way for the appellate court's regionalization. The court in the Visayas sits in Cebu City, while Cagayan de Oro is home to the court for Mindanao.

On August 18, 2007, the then-president of the Cebu City Chapter of the Integrated Bar of the Philippines, Briccio Joseph Boholst, opposed the abolition of the court in Cebu City, as he claimed that it would cause inconvenience for both litigants and lawyers. Supreme Court Associate Justice Ruben Reyes was tasked to investigate and submit his recommendations to the High Tribunal regarding the alleged massive graft and corruption of justices, especially in the issuance of temporary restraining orders.

On February 1, 2018, the court celebrated its 82nd Anniversary.

Incumbent justices

The Court of Appeals consists of a presiding justice and sixty-eight associate justices.

Presiding Justice of the Court of Appeals

Associate Justice of the Court of Appeals

Appointed by President Gloria Macapagal-Arroyo

Appointed by President Benigno Aquino III

Appointed by President Rodrigo Duterte

Appointed by President Bongbong Marcos

Divisions
In view of the recent appointments of Justices Palacio-Alaras and Wilhelmina Jorge-Wagan on October 11, 2022 and the recent retirement of Justice Barrrios on November 29, 2022, Court of Appeals Presiding Justice Remedios Salazar-Fernando issued a reorganization document via Office Order No. 526-22-RSF on November 27, 2022, and took effect on December 1, 2022.

Demographics

By appointing president

By Gender

By tenure

Former justices

Court of Appeals presiding justices of the Philippines

See also
Chief Justice of the Supreme Court of the Philippines
Court of Tax Appeals of the Philippines
Sandiganbayan
Philippines
Political history of the Philippines
Constitution of the Philippines

References

Sources
History of the Court of Appeals

External links
Philippines: Gov.Ph: About the Philippines – Justice category
The Philippines Court of Appeals – Official website

 
Philippines
Courts in the Philippines
1936 establishments in the Philippines
Courts and tribunals established in 1936